Piripi Taumata-a-Kura (fl. 1823–1868) was a notable New Zealand Māori evangelist. Of Māori descent, he identified with the Ngati Porou iwi. He was born in Whakawhitira, East Coast, New Zealand and was active from about 1823.

References

Year of death unknown
New Zealand Māori religious leaders
Ngāti Porou people
Year of birth unknown